Phyllocnistis chrysophthalma is a moth of the family Gracillariidae, known from Karnataka, India.

The hostplants for the species include Cinnamomum verum and Cinnamomum zeylanicum. They mine the leaves of their host plant. The mine has the form of a blotch under the lower cuticle. It is elongate and wandering and the course of the larva is marked by frass forming a wavy continuous fine dark line.

References

Phyllocnistis
Endemic fauna of India
Moths of Asia
Moths described in 1915